Count Hermann Alexander de Pourtalès (31 March 1847 – 28 November 1904) was a Swiss sailor who competed in the 1900 Summer Olympics.

Early life
Pourtalès was born in Neuchâtel, Switzerland on 31 March 1847.  He was a son of Count Alexandre Joseph de Pourtalès (1810–1833) and the former Auguste Saladin (1815–1885). His sister, Isabelle Marguerite de Pourtales, was the wife of archaeologist Henri Édouard Naville, a prominent Egyptologist who found a statue of Ramesses II at Bubastis.

His paternal grandparents were Louis de Pourtalès (a brother of James-Alexandre de Pourtalès and Frédéric de Pourtalès, grandfather of Friedrich von Pourtalès) and Sophie de Guy d'Audanger. His nephew was Bernard de Pourtalès. The Pourtalès family were French Huguenots who settled in Neuchâtel following the revocation of the Edict of Nantes in 1685. His maternal grandfather was Antoine Charles Guillaume Saladin.

Career
Pourtalès was a captain of the Cuirassiers of the Guard, in the service of the King of Prussia Wilhelm I who later became the German Emperor.

Olympic career
He was a member of the Swiss boat Lérina, which won the gold medal in the first race of 1 — 2 ton and silver medal in the second race of 1 — 2 ton class. He also participated in the open class, but did not finish. His wife Hélène and nephew Bernard were crew members.

Personal life
Pourtalès was married to Marguerite "Daisy" Marcet (1857–1888), a daughter of William Marcet, president of the Royal Meteorological Society. In 1887, the family returned to Switzerland, where they lived first at Malagny, near Versoix, in the Canton of Geneva.  Together, they were the parents of:

 Count Guy de Pourtalès (1881–1941), an author who married Hélène Marcuard in 1911.
 Count Raimond Pourtalès (1882–1914), attache of the German embassy, who married Countess Luise Alexandra von Bernstorff (1888–1971), daughter of Johann Heinrich von Bernstorff, the German Ambassador to the United States in 1911.  The wedding, which took place in Washington, D.C. was attended by William Howard Taft, who was then the President of the United States.  After his death in 1914, she remarried to Prince Johannes Baptista of Löwenstein-Wertheim-Rosenberg (1880-1956), the youngest son of Charles, 6th Prince of Löwenstein-Wertheim-Rosenberg.
 Constance Catherine Henriette de Pourtalès (1884–1973), who married Jules Jean Alfred Frossard de Saugy.
 Augusta von Pourtalès (1886–1972), who married Otto von Mitzlaff, an officer in the Uhlans Guard.

After the death of his first wife in 1888, Pourtalès remarried to American heiress Helen Barbey in 1891. She was a daughter of Henry Isaac Barbey and Mary Lorillard Barbey and a granddaughter of Pierre Lorillard III Her sister Eva was married to André Poupart, Baron de Neuflize (son of Baron Jean de Neuflize the older brother of the Countess of Bessborough). After their marriage, they lived at Mies in the Canton de Vaud.

Count de Pourtalès died on 28 November 1904 in Geneva.

References

External links

1847 births
1904 deaths
Swiss male sailors (sport)
Sailors at the 1900 Summer Olympics – 1 to 2 ton
Olympic sailors of Switzerland
Medalists at the 1900 Summer Olympics
Olympic gold medalists for Switzerland
Olympic silver medalists for Switzerland
Pourtalès family
Olympic medalists in sailing
People from Neuchâtel
Sportspeople from the canton of Neuchâtel
Sailors at the 1900 Summer Olympics – Open class
German people of Swiss descent